The Prize Pest is a 1951 Warner Bros. Looney Tunes cartoon directed by Robert McKimson, and written by Tedd Pierce. The cartoon was released on December 22, 1951, and stars Daffy Duck and Porky Pig.

Plot
After listening to one of his favorite radio programs, Porky Pig receives a grand prize from the station. Out of the gift box pops Daffy Duck, who insists on living in Porky's house. After numerous attempts to throw Daffy out of the house, Daffy devises a plan to stay. He tells Porky that he has a split personality (á la The Strange Case of Dr. Jekyll and Mr. Hyde). When people treat him with kindness, he becomes sweet and cuddly, whereas when treated badly, he turns into a hideous monster, which he does by messing his hair up and putting in fangs. Getting the idea, Porky promises to be nice to Daffy, who then begins to treat him like a servant. 

Porky intends to call the authorities about Daffy without him knowing, only to be outsmarted by Daffy who impersonates the phone. Daffy puts up his monster guise on and chases Porky around the house. When Porky realizes he's been had (after coming out scared from a closet with a skeleton in it, presumably put in there by Daffy), he decides to outsmart this psychotic duck and get him out of the house by dressing up as a monster. When Daffy sees the monster ("Sufferin' catfish, I never realized I was THAT hideous. I'M NOT!"), he becomes so scared, he falls apart (literally) and runs out of the house screaming (putting himself back in the gift box in the process). When Porky accidentally sees himself in the mirror in his monster costume (which he stated that only a craven little coward would be scared of), he scares himself so much that he jumps onto a chandelier ("So I'm a craven little coward").

Aftermath
The Prize Pest is considered by some to be one of the last screwball Daffy Duck cartoons, as all of the directors eventually stuck with the greedy, self-centered Daffy that emerged in Rabbit Fire (1951).
The cartoon was incerpted in the 1988 compilation film Daffy Duck's Quackbusters in which Daffy hired Porky in his "Paranormalist at Large" company. The cartoon was shortened in the movie, with a mix of new animation.
Daffy reprises his "crazy" look from this short in the Looney Tunes Show episode "Devil Dog" when trying to distract some SWAT team guys while Bugs and Taz escape.

References

External links

Looney Tunes shorts
1951 animated films
1951 short films
1951 films
Films directed by Robert McKimson
Daffy Duck films
Porky Pig films
1950s Warner Bros. animated short films
Films about dissociative identity disorder
Films scored by Carl Stalling
1950s English-language films
Films produced by Edward Selzer